Lisy Nos railway station is a railway station in Lisy Nos, St. Petersburg, Russia.

It was built by the JSC Prinorskaya Saint Peterburg–Sestroretsk railway and opened on 31 October 1894 as part of the Primorskaya line Lakhta–Razdelnaya section, under the name "Razdelnaya".

The station was renamed "Lisy Nos" in 1928, following the closure of the branch line to old Lisy Nos station which was on a landing stage on Kronstadt Bay.

Gallery

References 

Railway stations in Saint Petersburg
Railway stations in the Russian Empire opened in 1894